Thomas Beck (born 21 February 1981) is a retired Liechtenstein football striker who last played for FC Triesenberg.

Beck also played for the Liechtenstein national football team. He earned 92 caps and scored five goals for Liechtenstein after making his international debut in a Euro 2000 qualifier against Romania in September 1998.

Beck retired from international play in late 2013.

International goals

Honours 

Individual

 Liechtensteiner Footballer of the Year: 2004–05

References

External links 
 Liechtenstein FA profile 

1981 births
Living people
Liechtenstein international footballers
FC Chiasso players
Liechtenstein expatriate footballers
Expatriate footballers in Austria
Liechtenstein footballers
FC Balzers players
Association football forwards